Håkon Øverby (5 December 1941 – 10 November 2021) was a Norwegian sport wrestler.

Øverby was born in Oslo, and represented the sports club SK av 1909. He participated in the 87 kg weight class (middleweight) in wrestling at the 1968 Summer Olympics, where he exited after the fourth round. He then finished fifth at the 1968 European Wrestling Championships and fifth at the 1969 World Wrestling Championships. He then participated in the 90 kg weight class (light-heavyweight) in wrestling at the 1972 Summer Olympics, where he finished fifth overall. He took eleven national championships (eight in light heavyweight) between 1963 and 1976.

References

External links

Håkon Øverby's obituary 

1941 births
2021 deaths
Sportspeople from Oslo
Middleweight boxers
Light-heavyweight boxers
Wrestlers at the 1968 Summer Olympics
Wrestlers at the 1972 Summer Olympics
Norwegian male sport wrestlers
Olympic wrestlers of Norway
20th-century Norwegian people
21st-century Norwegian people